Magomed Musaev (born 11 March 1989) is a Russian-Kyrgyzstani heavyweight freestyle wrestler of Ingush origin. He competed at the 2012 and 2016 Olympics and placed seventh and ninth, respectively. Musaev won silver medals at the 2014 and 2018 Asian Games.

Musaev has degrees from the Kyrgyz State University of Physical Education and the Moscow Institute of Entrepreneurship and Law. He took up Greco-Roman wrestling at age 14, and later changed to freestyle.

References

External links
 

1989 births
Living people
People from Malgobek
Olympic wrestlers of Kyrgyzstan
Kyrgyzstani people of Ingush descent
Asian Games medalists in wrestling
Kyrgyzstani male sport wrestlers
Asian Games silver medalists for Kyrgyzstan

Wrestlers at the 2012 Summer Olympics
Wrestlers at the 2016 Summer Olympics
Wrestlers at the 2014 Asian Games
Medalists at the 2014 Asian Games
Wrestlers at the 2018 Asian Games
Medalists at the 2018 Asian Games
Asian Wrestling Championships medalists
21st-century Kyrgyzstani people